Lev Rebet (March 3, 1912 – October 12, 1957) was a Ukrainian political writer and anti-communist during World War II. He was a key cabinet member in the Ukrainian government (backed by Stepan Bandera's faction of OUN) which proclaimed independence on June 30, 1941. For a time, Rebet was the leader of the Ukrainian government.

Early life
Rebet was born in the town of Stryi, in Western Ukraine to a Ukrainian father and a mother of presumably Jewish origins. His father was a postal official. Rebet was both deeply religious as Greek rite Catholic and very physically active from an early age. He was a member of "Plast", the Ukrainian scout organization.

Political activity

Youth
Rebet joined the Ukrayinska Viyskova Orhanizatsiya - UVO (Ukrainian Military Organization) at age 17. This eventually led to membership in the Organization of Ukrainian Nationalists, the OUN.

Early political career
Rebet became a key writer and thinker in the Organization of Ukrainian Nationalists, (OUN ), quickly rising to the rank of "Holova Krayovoyi Ekzekutyvy" (Regional Commander), a post which he held from 1934 to 1938.

When the OUN split in 1940 into OUN-Melnyk and OUN-Bandera, Rebet joined the OUN-Bandera group.

June 30, 1941
On June 30, 1941, when the OUN proclaimed independence in Wehrmacht-occupied Lviv (renamed "Lemberg" until late 1944), Rebet became the deputy prime minister of the Ukrainian government, appointed by the prime minister Yaroslav Stetsko.

When Stetsko was arrested, Rebet became acting prime minister of the Government.

Arrest and internment by the Nazis

In August 1941, Rebet was arrested by the Gestapo. He spent the next three years in the Sachsenhausen concentration camp in Zellenbau – a section where political prisoners were kept.

Publications and assassination

Rebet was very active in exile with publications. He worked as the editor of a number of periodicals. In 1949, he completed his doctoral dissertation and in the 1950s took up research and scholarship in the fields of law, politics and sociology. His major works included "The Formation of the Ukrainian Nation" (1951) and "The Theory of Nations" (1956).

He was assassinated on 12 October 1957 in Munich by a KGB agent, Bohdan Stashynsky, using a poison atomizer mist gun. After Rebet was assassinated, his widow Daria continued his work.

Stashynsky would assassinate Rebet's associate Stepan Bandera by similar means in 1959.

Aftermath
Rebet's death was at first believed to have been from natural causes. However, Stashynsky defected to West Berlin in 1961,  voluntarily surrendered and testified to the West German prosecution.

Explaining what motivated him to kill Rebet, Stashynsky told a court that he had been told that Rebet was "the leading theorist of the Ukrainians in exile," since "in his newspapers Suchasna Ukrayina (Contemporary Ukraine), Chas (Time), and Ukrayinska Trybuna (Ukrainian Tribune) he not so much provided accounts of daily events as developed primarily ideological issues."

According to West German Intelligence chief Reinhard Gehlen, 

...Bohdan Stashinskyi, who had been persuaded by his German-born wife Inge to confess to the crimes and take the load off his troubled conscience, stuck resolutely to his statements. His testimony convinced the investigating authorities. He reconstructed the crimes exactly as they had happened, revisiting the crumbling business premises at the Stachus, in the heart of Munich, where Lev Rebet had entered the office of a Ukrainian exile newspaper, his suitcase in his hand. And he showed how the hydrogen cyanide capsule had exploded in Rebet's face and how he had left him slumped over the rickety staircase. The case before the Federal court began on October 8, 1962, and world interest in the incident was revived. Passing sentence eleven days later, the court identified Stashinskyi's unscrupulous employer Shelyepin as the person primarily responsible for the hideous murders, and the defendant -- who had given a highly credible account of the extreme pressure applied to him by the KGB to act as he did -- received a comparatively mild sentence. He served most of it and was released...

In 1984, Associated Press reported that Bohdan and Inge Stashinsky had been given new identities and had been provided asylum by the Government of South Africa.

References

Sources
 Symon Petliura, Yevhen Konovalets, Stepan Bandera - Three Leaders of Ukrainian Liberation Movement murdered by the Order of Moscow. Ukrainian Publishers Limited. 237, Liverpool Road, London, United Kingdom. 1962. (audiobook).
 (In Russian) Chuyev, Sergei - Ukrainskyj Legion -  Moscow, 2006
 (In Ukrainian) Encyclopedia of Ukraine - Munich, 1973, Vol. 7p. 2475
 The Ukrainian Weekly

1912 births
1957 deaths
Assassinated Ukrainian politicians
People from Stryi
People from the Kingdom of Galicia and Lodomeria
Organization of Ukrainian Nationalists
Ukrainian people murdered abroad
People murdered in Germany
Extrajudicial killings
Ukrainian anti-communists
Ukrainian Jews
Jews executed by the Soviet Union
Sachsenhausen concentration camp survivors
People killed in KGB operations
Ukrainian independence activists
Soviet emigrants to Germany